Mini Ton class was an offshore sailing class of the International Offshore Rule.

Boats
Mini Ton class boats include:

Aegean 234
Everitt E Boat
Fan 22
Fox Terrier 22
Everitt Glass Onion
Intro 22
Irwin Min-Ton
Kiwi 22
Limbo 6.6
Mirage 5.5
Monark 700
Mystic Mini-Ton
Ranger 22
Show 22
Sunshine 22
Thomas Sonata

See also
Quarter Ton class
Half Ton class
Three-Quarter Ton class
One Ton class
Two Ton class
Midget Ocean Racing Club

References

Development sailing classes
Keelboats